Preludes is a musical fantasia set in the mind of Sergei Rachmaninoff, written and composed by Dave Malloy. The music is a combination of compositions by Rachmaninoff, Malloy, hybrids of the two, as well as music and lyrics from other related compositions.

Synopsis

After the disastrous premiere of his first symphony, the young Rachmaninoff suffers from writer's block. He begins daily sessions with a therapeutic hypnotist, in an effort to overcome depression and return to composing.

Musical numbers
Music and lyrics by Dave Malloy except where noted.

Act I

Act II

†Not included on the Original Cast Recording
§ Music by Sergei Rachmaninoff

Principal roles and cast members

Productions
The piece premiered Off-Broadway in June 2015 at Lincoln Center Theater 3. The production team was helmed by Rachel Chavkin as director, Or Matias as music director, Bradley King as lighting designer, Mimi Lien as set designer, and Paloma Young as costume designer, all of whom had already collaborated with Malloy on Natasha, Pierre and the Great Comet of 1812.

In January 2017, the show made its European and German-language premiere at the Landestheater Linz, Austria. It was directed by Johannes von Matuschka and music directed by Billy Christopher Maupin.

In 2018, Preludes was performed at Richmond, Virginia's Firehouse Theatre from May 23 to June 30. It was directed by Billy Christopher Maupin and music directed by Susan Randolph Braden. The production team also featured Emily Dandridge as Choreographer, Tennessee Dixon as set and projection designer, Christian DeAngelis as lighting designer, Leslie Cook-Day as costume designer, and Ryan Dygert as sound designer.

Preludes premiered Off West End at the Southwark Playhouse on September 6, 2019 in a limited run until October 12. The creative team was led by Alex Sutton as director and Jordan Li-Smith as music director, along with Christopher Nairne as lighting designer, Rebecca Brower as costume designer, Andrew Johnson as sound designer, Ste Clough as choreographer, Daisy On as stage manager. This production returned as a staged concert for three performances, live-streamed by the Southwark Playhouse due to the Covid-19 pandemic on May 8th and 9th 2021.

Critical response
The piece was well received by the New York press; Ben Brantley in the New York Times wrote “Writer’s block turns out to be a lot more inspiring than you could ever have imagine—and sad and stirring and gloriously fun. In Preludes, Dave Malloy makes beautiful music out of a composer’s three years of creative silence…the best musical about art’s agonies since Georges Seurat wielded a twitchy paintbrush in Stephen Sondheim and James Lapine’s Sunday in the Park With George. Mr. Malloy...incorporates wildly diverse sources—classical, folk, electro-pop—into a form that exists defiantly beyond the quotation marks of postmodernism. He’s that rarity, a smart sentimentalist whose self-consciousness about his feelings in no way dilutes them...Along with Fun Home and the soaring, Broadway-bound Hamilton, this smashing production says that the American musical is not only not dead but also growing luxuriantly in places you never expected."”

The London production received similarly strong reviews; Time Out and WhatsOnStage gave the production 4 stars and other reviewers gave it 5 stars.

Awards and nominations

Off-Broadway Production

Richmond Production

Recordings

A cast album of the original Lincoln Center production was released on January 19, 2016 by Ghostlight Records.

References

2015 musicals
Off-Broadway musicals
Sergei Rachmaninoff
Musicals by Dave Malloy
Fiction about hypnosis
Plays set in the Russian Empire